The 119 Squadron of the Israeli Air Force, also known as the Bat Squadron, is an F-16I fighter squadron based at Ramon Airbase.

119 formerly operated the McDonnell Douglas F-4 Phantom II, and prior to that the Vautour II, from Tel Nof Airbase. and the Gloster Meteor from Ramat David.

On 21 March 2018 the IAF officially confirmed that 119 Squadron, together with Squadrons 69 and 253, took part in Operation Orchard. During a briefing prior to the mission, the commander of 119 Squadron wrote in his notes that the operation “will change the face of the Middle East.”

See also
 Operation Tarnegol
 1973 Syrian General Staff Headquarters Raid
 Shimshon Rozen

Notes

References

External links
119 Tayeset "Ha'Atalef, www.aeroflight.co.uk

Israeli Air Force squadrons